Miss World USA 1975 was the 14th edition of the Miss World USA pageant and it was held in Springfield, Massachusetts and was won by Annelise Ilschenko of Ohio. She was crowned by outgoing titleholder, Terry Browning of Florida. Ilschenko went on to represent the United States at the Miss World 1975 Pageant in London later that year. She did not place at Miss World.

Results

Placements

Delegates
The Miss World USA 1975 delegates were:

 Alabama - Denise Banks
 Alaska - Karen Elizabeth Malcolm
 Arizona - Crickett Jones
 Arkansas - Mary Jane Comstock
 California - Debra Reichter
 Colorado - Donna Marie Pfannenstiel
 Connecticut - Annette L. Tedesco
 Delaware - Natasha A. Prater
 District of Columbia - America "Mary" Lou Fackler
 Florida -  Victoria Jean Bass
 Georgia - Terry Eileen Morse
 Hawaii - Tracy Lynn Monsarrat
 Idaho - Raenae Gay
 Illinois - Carrie Anne Kravchuk
 Indiana - Julie Jo Clifford
 Kansas - Elise Mark Pratt
 Kentucky - Carol Louise Shanander
 Louisiana - Lottie Metzler
 Maine - Debra J. Collet
 Maryland - Elizabeth Erinn Pittengee
 Massachusetts - Mona Jean Tessier
 Michigan - Cynthia Mimi Guenther
 Minnesota - Sheri Hueffmeier
 Mississippi - Paula "Suzanne" Belcher
 Missouri - Tamara Sue Hultz
 Nebraska - Linda Ann Bott
 Nevada - Janice Ann Carrell
 New Hampshire - Robin Davis
 New Jersey - Deborah Ann Boone
 New Mexico - Kathryn Louise Rehm
 New York - Hildegard Holig
 North Carolina - Tonda Brown
 Ohio - Annelise Ilschenko
 Oklahoma - Waukita Gaddy
 Oregon - Amanda Linn Peters
 Pennsylvania - Susan Volpe
 Rhode Island - Sue Strauss
 South Carolina - Vicki Corley
 South Dakota - Barbara Marie Guthmiller
 Tennessee - Susan Elizabeth Carlson
 Texas - Susan Schlesinger
 Utah - Karen Tucker
 Vermont - Nancy Gayle Wilson
 Virginia - Debbie Joan Evans
 Washington - Trudy Lorraine Holderby
 West Virginia - Rebecca Lynn Tudor
 Wisconsin - Debi Ann Burkman
 Wyoming - Tauna Presgrove

Notes

Did not Compete

Crossovers
Contestants who competed in other beauty pageants:

Miss USA
1972: : Julie Jo Clifford
1973: : Susan Elizabeth Carlson (1st Runner-Up; as )

Miss International
1976: : Susan Elizabeth Carlson (3rd Runner-up; as )

References

External links
Miss World Official Website
Miss World America Official Website

1975 in the United States
World America
1975
1975 in Massachusetts
20th century in Springfield, Massachusetts